The Bundesgartenschau (BUGA) is a biennial federal horticulture show in Germany. It also covers topics like landscaping. Taking place in different cities, the location changes in a two-year cycle.

BUGA cities

1951 – Hannover
1953 – Hamburg
1955 – Kassel
1957 – Cologne (Rheinpark)
1959 – Dortmund
1961 – Stuttgart
1963 – Hamburg
1965 – Essen
1967 – Karlsruhe
1969 – Dortmund
1971 – Cologne (Rheinpark)
1973 – Hamburg
1975 – Mannheim
1977 – Stuttgart
1979 – Bonn
1981 – Kassel
1983 – München
1985 – Berlin
1987 – Düsseldorf
1989 – Frankfurt am Main
1991 – Dortmund
1993 – Stuttgart
1995 – Cottbus
1997 – Gelsenkirchen
1999 – Magdeburg
2001 – Potsdam
2003 – Rostock (IGA)
2005 – München
2007 – Gera (Hofwiesenpark) and Ronneburg (Thüringen) ("Neue Landschaft Ronneburg" new landscape Ronneburg)
2011 – Koblenz
2013 – Hamburg (IGA)
2015 – region of Havel
2017 – Berlin, at Marzahn Park (IGA)
2019 – Heilbronn
2021 – Erfurt
2023 – Mannheim

References

External links 

 
 BUGA 2011 in Koblenz
 BUGA-aera of the Fortress Ehrenbreitstein in Koblenz
 BUGA 2009 in Schwerin
 BUGA 2007 in Gera/Ronneburg
 Review to the BUGA 2005 in Munich

Horticultural exhibitions
Biennial events
Flower festivals in Germany
Garden festivals in Germany
Recurring events established in 1951
1951 establishments in West Germany